Sheridan Caroline Sian Smith OBE (born 25 June 1981) is an English actress, singer and television personality. Smith came to prominence after playing a variety of characters on sitcoms such as The Royle Family (1999–2000), Two Pints of Lager and a Packet of Crisps (2001–2009), Gavin & Stacey (2008–2010), and Benidorm (2009). She played the role of Joey Ross on the drama series Jonathan Creek (2009–2013) and went on to receive acclaim for starring in a succession of television dramas, such as Mrs Biggs (2012), Cilla (2014), The C Word (2015), Black Work (2015), and The Moorside (2017). Her feature film credits include Tower Block (2012), Quartet (2012), and The Huntsman: Winter's War (2016).

Smith has performed in the West End musicals Little Shop of Horrors (2007), Legally Blonde (2010), Funny Girl (2016), and Joseph and the Amazing Technicolour Dreamcoat (2019). She released her debut album, Sheridan, in 2017. Her second album, A Northern Soul, was released in 2018.

In late 2006, Smith started voicing Lucie Miller for Doctor Who, as part of the BBC7 Big Finish audio range, alongside Paul McGann's Eighth Doctor, in the story Blood of the Daleks.

Smith performed at D-Day 75: A Tribute to Heroes commemorating the 75th anniversary of the Normandy landings during World War II. She sang "When the Lights Go On Again" twice, the second time as the closing song.

Smith is the recipient of two Laurence Olivier Awards, a British Academy Television Award, a National Television Award and a BPG Award, as well as two International Emmy Award nominations. She was appointed Officer of the Order of the British Empire (OBE) in the 2015 New Year Honours for services to drama.

Early life and education
Sheridan Caroline Sian Smith was born on 25 June 1981 in Epworth, Lincolnshire, the only daughter of Marylin Smith and the late Colin Smith (1936–2016). Her grandfather was a banjo player in Yorkshire and later played as a trio with his daughters. Smith studied dance at the Joyce Mason School of Dancing from an early age. She later attended South Axholme Comprehensive School; she was a member of the National Youth Music Theatre from 1995 to 2001, performing a number of understudy roles in productions such as Bugsy Malone, Pendragon, and Into the Woods. She completed her further education at John Leggott College in Scunthorpe.

Career

Film and television
From 1999 to 2000, Smith played Emma in The Royle Family. She played Janet Keogh in the long-running series Two Pints of Lager and a Packet of Crisps from 2001 until 2009. In February 2003, she appeared in "Immediate Care", an episode of The Royal, where she played the part of Francesca Wheeler, a teenage girl who was suffering from leukaemia. In 2004, she made a one-episode appearance in Mile High as Suzy, an airport cleaner who impersonates a flight attendant in an attempt to become cabin crew. She also featured in The Comic Strips 2005 episode "Sex Actually" as Angie.

Smith played Cleo Martin in Love Soup (2005) and starred as Michelle, a hypocritical nutritionist, in three series of the sitcom Grownups (2006–2009). She has also appeared on The Lenny Henry Show as M.E. Westmocott, a role spoofing the various medical examiners on CSI. In the 2009 Two Pints of Lager Comic Relief special, which crossed over with Grownups, she played her characters from both series.

Smith has also appeared in a number of other shows including the BBC's Eyes Down, in which she played Sandy, and smaller parts in shows such as The Bill and Fat Friends. She featured as Rudi, Smithy's little sister, in the second and third series of the BBC Three sitcom Gavin & Stacey. She guest starred in the Christmas 2008 episode of Lark Rise to Candleford. Since 2009, she has played Joey Ross in special seasonal episodes of Jonathan Creek, namely "The Grinning Man" (2009), "The Judas Tree" (2010), and "The Clue of the Savant's Thumb" (2013). She played Brandy in the third series of Benidorm.

During 2010, Smith acted as a mentor to the contestants of the BBC show Over the Rainbow. Sky Arts' Chekhov Comedy Shorts also featured Smith in 2010 when she starred as Natasha in The Proposal. She appeared in the 2011 film Hysteria, about the invention of the vibrator. For the factual hospital series Bizarre ER, she took over narration duties from Freema Agyeman. She appeared in the 2012 ITV film adaptation of Daphne du Maurier's novel The Scapegoat.

In September 2012 Smith played the title role in Mrs Biggs, a five-part series on ITV. In 2013, she appeared in the Channel 4 series Dates. In January 2014, she starred in the two-part BBC drama The 7.39. In March 2014, she appeared in the ITV crime drama The Widower as the first wife of serial killer Malcolm Webster. Later that year, she featured in the series Who Do You Think You Are? and played Cilla Black in the three-part ITV drama series Cilla.

In 2015 she starred as cancer patient Lisa Lynch in the one-off BBC drama The C Word and as policewoman Jo Gillespie in the three-part ITV drama Black Work, which was nominated for a National Television Award in 2016.

Smith narrated the reality series Bear Grylls: Mission Survive from 2015. The show was nominated for a National Television Award in 2016 but was cancelled after two series. In February 2017, she starred in The Moorside, a BBC drama based on the kidnapping of Shannon Matthews in 2008.

She appeared in her own ITV music special in November 2017. Titled Sheridan, the one-off special presented by Alexander Armstrong saw her performing some of the songs from her album, and talking about her life.

In December 2017, Smith starred as evil step-mum Sheila in the television adaptation of David Walliams' children's book, Ratburger. It was broadcast on Sky One. In January 2019, she appeared as Sam in ITV drama series Cleaning Up.

In January 2021, Smith appeared as a guest judge in the second series of the BBC drag competition series, RuPaul's Drag Race UK. Later in 2021, she presented the BBC dog-grooming competition Pooch Perfect.

In January 2022, Smith starred as Jenna in The Teacher, a drama series about a drinking, smoking, hard-living teacher who is accused of sleeping with one of her students. Critics generally were positive of Smith, with one reviewer for The Independent praising her performance as "so much flair and vulnerability" and rating the show 4/5 stars. In June 2022, Smith narrated all episodes of Channel 5 docusoap The Cruise.

Theatre
Smith's theatre credits include the musical Into the Woods at London's Donmar Warehouse, and Shakespeare's The Taming of the Shrew and A Midsummer Night's Dream at the Open Air Theatre, Regent's Park. She also played Audrey in the stage production of Little Shop of Horrors at the Menier Chocolate Factory, London, from November 2006, with the production then transferring to the Duke of York's Theatre in March 2007. Following a successful run the production moved again at the end of June 2007 to the New Ambassadors Theatre, where its played until September 2007. Smith was nominated for the 2008 Laurence Olivier Award for Best Actress in a Leading Role in a Musical for her performance in the show.

Smith appeared as Vanessa in Tinderbox: a Revenge Comedy by Lucy Kirkwood at the Bush Theatre, Shepherd's Bush, in April 2008. Smith originated the role of Elle Woods in the musical version of Legally Blonde in its transfer from Broadway to London's West End in December 2009. Ex-Blue boyband member Duncan James played opposite Smith until June 2010, when he was replaced by Richard Fleeshman. Other cast members Smith has performed alongside include Aoife Mulholland as Brooke, Denise Van Outen as Paulette, Peter Davison as Professor Callahan and Alex Gaumond as Emmett Forrest. Her performance was well received, The Daily Telegraph describing her as: "blessed with vitality, warmth, great comic timing and sudden moments of touching vulnerability. She is infinitely more likeable than Reese Witherspoon in the film."

Smith was originally supposed to leave Legally Blonde on 23 October 2010, but she extended her run to 8 January 2011, when Susan McFadden took over the role. For her role in Legally Blonde, Smith won the WhatsOnStage.com Theatregoers' Choice Award for Best Actress in a Musical. She was also nominated for the Evening Standard Natasha Richardson Award for Best Actress and was the winner of the Laurence Olivier Award for Best Actress in a Leading Role in a Musical.

Between March and June 2011, she appeared in Trevor Nunn's production of Flare Path at the Theatre Royal, Haymarket as Doris, a former barmaid married to a Polish count in the RAF. The production was part of the playwright Terence Rattigan's centenary year celebrations and also starred Sienna Miller and James Purefoy. For this role she won the 2012 Laurence Olivier Award for Best Performance in a Supporting Role, the 2011 Evening Standard Natasha Richardson Award for Best Actress and the BroadwayWorld UK Award for Best Featured Actress in a Play.

As well as her role in Legally Blonde, Smith also performed the title role in the workshop productions of a new musical adaptation of Bridget Jones' Diary. On 5 April 2012, it was announced that Smith had decided to pull out of the musical, and would no longer be playing the title role, delaying the production of the show.

From September to November 2012, Smith played the title role in Hedda Gabler at the Old Vic, winning the 2013 Theatregoers' Choice Award for "Best Actress in a Leading Role" in a Play. Shortly before collecting her award at the ceremony on 17 February 2013, Smith performed the original song "Stagey and Proud", which was written by Chris Passey and Amy Carroll.
From September to November 2013, she starred alongside David Walliams in a West End production of A Midsummer Night's Dream, as part of Michael Grandage's season of plays at the Noël Coward Theatre.

Smith starred in a new London production of the musical Funny Girl. It previewed at the Menier Chocolate Factory from 20 November 2015, opened on 2 December and ran until 6 March 2016. The show then transferred to the Savoy Theatre in the West End for a 12-week run, but extended through 8 October 2016. Sheridan Smith states in The Stage that she is married to the job. Smith continued with the role throughout its UK Tour.

Smith played the Narrator in a new production of Tim Rice and Andrew Lloyd Webber's Joseph and the Amazing Technicolor Dreamcoat at the London Palladium over the 2019 summer season with Jason Donovan as The Pharaoh and Jac Yarrow as Joseph.

Radio
Smith played companion Lucie Miller alongside Paul McGann's Eighth Doctor in a radio series of Doctor Who, produced by Big Finish and transmitted on BBC 7 from New Year's Eve 2006; the plays returned in a second series released on CD and scheduled for BBC 7 broadcast. A third series of adventures for Lucie and the Doctor aired in March 2009, as weekly half-hour downloads followed by a Christmas Special. Lucie Miller made her final appearances in the fourth series, ending in 2011. She also narrated two Big Finish Short Trips stories, "The Curse of the Fugue" and "Flashpoint."  Smith has reprised her role as Lucie Miller opposite McGann's Eighth Doctor in The Further Adventures of Lucie Miller, released in July 2019. Smith also appeared as Ruby Ruggles in the 2008 radio serial The Way We Live Right Now, and took over the role of Tamsin Trelawny in series 2 of Elephants to Catch Eels on BBC Radio 4.

Personal life
Smith has spoken about her anxiety, panic attacks, and difficulties with alcohol. Smith was in a relationship with James Corden from 2007 until they split in 2009. Together they have a son, born in May 2020.

Discography

Albums

Singles

Filmography

Film

Television

Non-acting television

Theatre

Awards and nominations

Music 

Classic BRIT Awards

Theatre 

BroadwayWorld UK Awards

Evening Standard Awards

Laurence Olivier Awards

Manchester Theatre Awards

Whatsonstage.com Audience Awards

Television 

AACTA Awards

BAFTA TV Awards

Emmy Awards

National Television Awards

Royal Television Society Awards

TV Choice Award

Women in Film & Television Awards

See also
 List of British actors

References

External links
 

1981 births
Living people
20th-century English actresses
21st-century English actresses
Critics' Circle Theatre Award winners
Actresses from Lincolnshire
Best Actress BAFTA Award (television) winners
English film actresses
English women pop singers
English musical theatre actresses
English soap opera actresses
English stage actresses
English radio actresses
English television actresses
Laurence Olivier Award winners
People educated at Joyce Mason School of Dance
People from Epworth, Lincolnshire
English Shakespearean actresses
Officers of the Order of the British Empire
WFTV Award winners
English people of Welsh descent
East West Records artists
Warner Records artists